The BMW Central Building Located in Leipzig, Germany was the winning design submitted for competition by Pritzker Prize winning architect, Zaha Hadid. The central building is the nerve center for BMW's new $1.55 billion complex built to manufacture the BMW 3 Series.

Concept

The BMW factory prior to the construction of the central building existed as three disconnected buildings, each playing an integral part in the production of BMW 3 Series vehicles. These three production buildings were designed in-house by BMW's real estate and facility management group, housing separately the fabrication of raw auto bodies, the paint shop, and the final assembly hall. A competition was held for the design of a central building to function as the physical connection of the three units. It also needed to house the administrative and employee needs spaces. Hadid's design took this idea of connectivity and used it to inform every aspect of the new building. It serves as a connection for the assembly process steps and the employees. Designed as a series of overlapping and interconnecting levels and spaces, it blurs the separation between parts of the complex and creates a level ground for both blue and white collar employees, visitors, and the cars.

The building

From a pool of 25 international architects , the BMW jury chose the very innovative design of Zaha Hadid as the final piece of the BMW plant in Leipzig, Germany. With no real precedent for her design, Zaha Hadid's Central Building can only be related to the revolutionary and monumental industrial designs of the past including Fiat Lingotto Factory by G. Matté-Trucco and the AEG Turbine Factory in Berlin by Peter Behrens. The BMW Central building is a  facility that makes up only  of the  campus. Serving 5,500 employees, the building functions as the most important piece of the factory, connecting the three production sheds. Each day, 650 BMW 3 Series sedans pass through the Central Building on an elevated conveyor as they move from one of the three production sheds to the next. Dim blue LED lights highlight the vehicles after each stage, as they exit one of the sheds. These conveyors not only take the vehicles from one production shed to another, but do so directly through all of the functional spaces of the Central Building. The offices, meeting rooms, and public relations facilities are all built around these elevated conveyors, creating an interesting relationship between the employees, the cars, and the public. Not only is the Central Building an office building and public relations center for the factory, it is also a very important piece of the production process at the factory. All of the load-bearing walls, floors, and office levels are made of cast-in-place concrete, while the roof structure is composed of structural steel beams and space frame construction. The facade is clad in simple materials of like corrugated metal, channel glass, and glass curtain walls .

The buildings has received numerous architectural awards, including a 2006 RIBA European Award, and was placed on the shortlist for the Stirling Prize.

Diagrammatic Plan Of BMW Central Building Productions Sheds

Quick facts

 Building Name:  BMW Central Building
 Location: Leipzig, Germany
 Client: BMW AG, Munich, Germany
 Architect: Zaha Hadid
 Building Footprint:  
 Total Area:  
 Building Cost: $60 million 
 Groundbreaking: March 2003 
 Completion: May 2005
 Employees in Factory: 5,500
 Program: Control Functions, Offices/Admin., Meeting rooms, Cafeteria, Public Relations
 Parking: 4,100 Spaces
 Total Complex Cost: $1.55 Billion

Timeline

 November 2001: Competition Phase #1
 November 2002: Competition Phase #2
 March 2002: Jury Decision
 August 2002: Design Development Completed
 2002/2003: Construction Documents Completed/Bidding and Negotiations
 March 2003: Groundbreaking/Construction Commenced
 January 2004: Steel Construction Completed
 March 2004: Building Enclosed
 June 2004: Car Park Completed
 September 2004: Central Building Completed
 May 2005: Landscaping Completed/Central Building Opened

References

 Hadid, Zaha (2006). BMW Central Building. New York, NY: Princeton Architectural Press. 
 Architectural Record | Project Portfolio | BMW Plant Leipzig, Central Building. Retrieved April 4, 2009, from Architecture Design for Architects | Architectural Record Web site: http://archrecord.construction.com/projects/portfolio/archives/0508BMW.asp
 BMW Central Building, Plant Leipzig by Zaha Hadid Architects | Project Portfolio | Architecture-Page. Retrieved April 4, 2009, from Architecture-Page | International resource for architecture and design Web site: https://web.archive.org/web/20090127024530/http://www.architecture-page.com/go/projects/bmw-central-building-plant-leipzig
 Barreneche, Raul (2005, August). Zaha Hadid provides the connective tissue for a BMW complex by designing central building that brings People and cars together. Architectural Record, 193(8), 82-91.
 (2005, August). Zaha Hadid: BMW Plant Leipzig, Central Building, Leipzig, Germany, 2005.. A + U: architecture and urbanism, 419(8), 66-85.

External links
 (n.d.). Zaha Hadid Architects. Retrieved April 5, 2009, from : http://www.zaha-hadid.com
 (n.d.). Zaha Hadid: BMW Central Building, Leipzig, Germany…Amazon.co.uk: Todd Gannon: Books. Retrieved April 5, 2009, from Amazon.co.uk: low prices in Electronics, Books, Music, DVDs & more: https://www.amazon.co.uk/Zaha-Hadid-Central-Building-Architecture/dp/1568985363
 (2007, April 4). BMW Central Building. Retrieved April 4, 2009, from Architectook: https://web.archive.org/web/20090107070248/http://architectook.net/bmw-central-building/
 (n.d.). The Tamed Snake - BMW's Central Building in Leipzig. Retrieved April 5, 2009, from DETAIL.de - Architekturportal und Architek: https://web.archive.org/web/20110314215211/http://www.detail.de/rw_5_Archive_En_HoleArtikel_5536_Artikel.htm
 (n.d.). Zaha Hadid Architects - Central Building . Retrieved April 5, 2009, from Architecture Online: https://web.archive.org/web/20090329095101/http://www.arcspace.com/architects/hadid/bmw_central/bmw_central.html

Zaha Hadid buildings
Buildings and structures in Leipzig
Postmodern architecture
Modernist architecture in Germany
BMW
Buildings and structures completed in 2005